The Ministry of the Overseas (French: Ministère des Outre-mer) is a ministry of the Government of France, responsible for overseeing the overseas departments, collectivities and territories of the French Republic. It is headed by the Minister of the Overseas, Jean-François Carenco, since July 2022.

History
Originally part of the Ministry of the Navy as a secretariat, it became a formal ministry on 20 March 1894 as the Ministry of the Colonies (French: Ministère des Colonies), by a law of the government of Jean Casimir-Perier.

By a decree of 26 January 1946, its name was changed to the current Ministry of Overseas.

See also
Minister of the Overseas (France)
Borne government

References

 
Overseas
Overseas France
1852 establishments in France